RTI-229, also known as (–)-3β-(4-iodophenyl)tropane-2β-pyrrolidine carboxamide and RTI-4229-229, is a potent and long-lasting stimulant drug which was developed in the 1990s as part of a large group of related analogues from the phenyltropane family. With the combination of two potent dopamine transporter (DAT) binding motifs attached to the tropane ring, the p-iodophenyl group at the 3β-position and a pyrrolidine carboxamide at 2β, RTI-229 has extremely high selectivity for the dopamine transporter (2600x and 4600x selective over NET and 5-HTT respectively) and is one of the most DAT-selective compounds in the RTI series.

Uses
RTI-229 is mainly used in scientific research into the dopamine reuptake transporter, with its extremely high DAT selectivity making it useful for distinguishing between DAT and NET binding sites in the brain to an even greater extent than related compounds such as RTI-121.

Legal Status
RTI-229 is legal throughout the world as of 2010. Some jurisdictions such as the United States, Australia and New Zealand might however consider RTI-229 to be a controlled substance analogue of cocaine on the grounds of its related chemical structure.

See also
 RTI-55
 List of Phenyltropanes

References

External links
Generic Adderall Uses & Side Effects

Carboxamides
Pyrrolidines
Iodoarenes
Tropanes
RTI compounds
Dopamine reuptake inhibitors
Stimulants
Sympathomimetic amines
Medical imaging
Neuroimaging